I'm Not Famous But I'm Aromanian is a 2013 Romanian comedy drama and romance film which was the first film in the Aromanian language.

The movie tells the story of Toni Caramușat, a famous film director, fascinated by the idea of finding the 13th fundamental truth about the Aromanians. First 12 truths were gathered by linguist  in her Dodecalog of Aromanians. According to myth, the 13th truth is held by Armãnamea, the last descendant of this people. In the movie, Toni goes on dates with young women from all over the world, in hope of finding both the truth and his soul mate.

The film won the "Maestrale Unica" award, a medal by the Italian Parliament, and the distinction of the European Parliament for best representation of a linguistic minority in Europe at the 2013 Babel Film Festival.

Cast
Toma Enache as Toni Caramușat
Linda Croitoru as Armãnamea
Lică Gherghilescu-Tanașoca as Tanasi Caramușat (father)
Teodora Calagiu Garofil as Haida
Rudy Rosenfeld as Iorgu
Sorin Șaguna as Ianis
Camelia Șapera as Tana
Nicu Baturi as capitain Tega
Anca Manolescu as judge
Constantin Florescu as airplane pilot
Alina Mantu as Teodora
Geo Dinescu as Vanghea
Mara Panaitescu as herself
Aurica Piha as Hrisa
Ana Donosa as Kira
Anca Zamfir as Marusa
Vasile Topa as mayor
Brad Vee Johnson as the narrator

References

External links
I'm Not Famous But I'm Aromanian at IMDB
Official movie trailer at YouTube
Film's official page on Facebook
 I'm Not Famous But I'm Aromanian at Cinemagia
 I'm Not Famous But I'm Aromanian  at CinemaRx
 Details about film  at aromanul.ro

2013 films
2013 romantic comedy-drama films
Romanian comedy-drama films
Aromanian-language films
Romanian romance films
2013 comedy films
2013 drama films
2010s English-language films